Charloe is an unincorporated community in Paulding County, in the U.S. state of Ohio. There is a grocery store with gasoline pumps, a cafe, and a small manufactury at Charloe.

History
An Ottawa Indian village stood at the site of Charloe, and the community was named for Charloe Peter, an Indian chief.   

Charloe was the county seat of Paulding County in the 1840s, but lost its county seat status to Paulding in 1851, prompting the former community's decline.

A post office was also established at Charloe in 1840, and remained in operation until it was discontinued in 1905.

References

Unincorporated communities in Paulding County, Ohio
Unincorporated communities in Ohio